South Waikato District is a local government district in the Waikato Region of the North Island of New Zealand. It is located between the cities of Hamilton to the north, Rotorua to the east, Taupo to the south and Ruapehu District to the west.

The seat of the South Waikato District Council is at Tokoroa, the biggest town. The other main towns are Putaruru, Tirau and Arapuni.

Populated places
South Waikato District consists of the following towns, localities, settlements and communities:

 Putaruru Ward:
 Arahiwi West1
 Arapuni
 Hodderville
 Lichfield
 Ngatira
 North Putaruru
 Pinedale
 Puketurua
 Putaruru
 Waotu

 Tirau Ward:
 Okoroire
 Piarere
 Tapapa
 Tirau
 Waiomou

 Tokoroa Ward:
 Kinleith
 North Tokoroa
 Te Whetu
 Tokoroa
 Upper Atiamuri
 Waipapa
 Wawa
 Wiltsdown

1 - partly shared with Rotorua Lakes

Demographics
The region's population decreased markedly during the 1990s, dropping over 4000 since the 1991 census.

Ngāti Raukawa is the Maori tribe of the area and goes back 20–25 generations. There are 32 marae in the district, Papa te Aroha marae (Catholic Community), Aotearoa marae, Pikitu marae (Nga-Huri), Pōhara marae (Ngati Koroki), Whakaaratamaiti marae (Ngati Mahana), Mangakaretu marae (Ngati Ahuru), Ngatira marae (Ngati Ahuru), Tarukenga marae (Ngati Te-Ngakau), Mokai marae (Ngati Te Kohera), Ongaroto marae (Ngati Whaita), Paparamu marae (Ngati Te Apunga), Te Ruapeka marae (Ngati Tukorehe), among others

South Waikato District had a population of 24,042 at the 2018 New Zealand census, an increase of 1,971 people (8.9%) since the 2013 census, and an increase of 1,401 people (6.2%) since the 2006 census. There were 8,511 households, comprising 11,982 males and 12,060 females, giving a sex ratio of 0.99 males per female. The median age was 37.9 years (compared with 37.4 years nationally), with 5,526 people (23.0%) aged under 15 years, 4,479 (18.6%) aged 15 to 29, 10,077 (41.9%) aged 30 to 64, and 3,963 (16.5%) aged 65 or older.

Ethnicities were 68.7% European/Pākehā, 35.3% Māori, 12.8% Pacific peoples, 4.2% Asian, and 1.5% other ethnicities. People may identify with more than one ethnicity.

The percentage of people born overseas was 13.5, compared with 27.1% nationally.

Although some people chose not to answer the census's question about religious affiliation, 50.7% had no religion, 35.2% were Christian, 3.0% had Māori religious beliefs, 0.6% were Hindu, 0.3% were Muslim, 0.4% were Buddhist and 1.6% had other religions.

Of those at least 15 years old, 1,722 (9.3%) people had a bachelor's or higher degree, and 5,100 (27.5%) people had no formal qualifications. The median income was $24,900, compared with $31,800 nationally. 2,238 people (12.1%) earned over $70,000 compared to 17.2% nationally. The employment status of those at least 15 was that 8,259 (44.6%) people were employed full-time, 2,541 (13.7%) were part-time, and 1,164 (6.3%) were unemployed.

Economy
The district's main industries are forestry and timber production, however land previously in plantation forest is increasingly being converted to dairy production. Several hydroelectric projects are located at the district's western edge.

Bent St. Skate Park 
One of South Waikato District's most prominent features is it historical skate-bowl park.  It was built in the 1980s, as one of the first skate parks in the country, and was recently chosen for a major refurbishment project.  This community-led project is set to receive $550,000 from the South Waikato District Council in order to facilitate its upgrade.  Intended upgrades include additional skating features, court area, and seating area.

References

External links

 Council website